Skirne which also includes the Byggve deposit is an offshore gas field in the North Sea located  east of the Heimdal gas field and  from Stavanger, Norway. Both Skirne and Byggve are considered satellites to Heimdal field and are connected to it by subsea pipelines. TotalFinaElf which is the operator had received the approval from Norwegian Ministry of Petroleum and Energy for development of the fields in 2002. The company holds 40% interest in the project. Other stakeholders are Petoro and Centrica. 
Both Skirne and Byggve have an estimated  of natural gas and about 10 million barrels of condensate, combined.

Skirne deposit
The Skirne field was discovered in 1990. and consists of Middle Jurassic sandstones of the Brent Group.

Byggve deposit

Production
Production at Skirne and Byggve started in 2004.

The fields are interconnected through two single-well tie-backs and transported to treatment facilities at Heimdal Gas Center, from which the processed gas is then exported to the United Kingdom through the Vesterled pipeline.

Total investment including the Vale satellite has been nearly 4 billion NOK which also included modifications on Heimdal, drilling operations, subsea templates and pipelines.

See also

Heimdal gas field
Vale gas field
Oseberg Transport System
Grane oil field
Oseberg oil field
North Sea oil
Economy of Norway

References

External links
 Total official website displaying the map with location of Skirne and Byggve fields

Oil fields in Norway
Natural gas fields in Norway
North Sea energy
TotalEnergies